General Foods 25th Anniversary Show: A Salute to Rodgers and Hammerstein is a two-hour TV special broadcast live on March 28, 1954, on all four major TV networks of the time, DuMont, CBS, NBC, and ABC.

The special was hosted by Groucho Marx, Mary Martin, Jack Benny, Ed Sullivan, and Edgar Bergen with his puppet Charlie McCarthy.

Songs
Sources:
 "Oklahoma" from Oklahoma! – Gordon MacRae, Florence Henderson, and chorus
 "It Might as Well Be Spring" from State Fair (1945) – Mary Martin
 "If I Loved You" from Carousel – John Raitt, Jan Clayton
 "Soliloquy" from Carousel – John Raitt
 "You Are Never Away" from Allegro – Bill Hayes and Janice Rule
 "I'm Gonna Wash That Man Right Outa My Hair" from South Pacific – Mary Martin and chorus
 "Some Enchanted Evening" from South Pacific – Mary Martin and Ezio Pinza
 "A Puzzlement" from The King and I – Yul Brynner
 "Oh, What a Beautiful Mornin'" from Oklahoma! – Gordon MacRae
 "I'm in Love with a Wonderful Guy" from South Pacific – Mary Martin
 "Getting to Know You" from The King and I – Patricia Morison
 "The Big Black Giant" and "No Other Love" from Me and Juliet – Rosemary Clooney, Tony Martin
 "People Will Say We're in Love" from Oklahoma! – Gordon MacRae, Florence Henderson

See also
List of programs broadcast by the DuMont Television Network
List of surviving DuMont Television Network broadcasts
Light's Diamond Jubilee (October 1954 special aired on all four American TV networks)

Bibliography
 David Weinstein, The Forgotten Network: DuMont and the Birth of American Television (Philadelphia: Temple University Press, 2004) 
 Alex McNeil, Total Television, Fourth edition (New York: Penguin Books, 1980) 
 Tim Brooks and Earle Marsh, The Complete Directory to Prime Time Network TV Shows, Third edition (New York: Ballantine Books, 1964)

References

External links

1950s American television specials
1954 in American television
1954 television specials
American Broadcasting Company television specials
Black-and-white American television shows
CBS television specials
DuMont Television Network original programming
American live television shows
Musical television specials
NBC television specials
Rodgers and Hammerstein